The 2014–15 Fairfield Stags men's basketball team represented Fairfield University during the 2014–15 NCAA Division I men's basketball season. The Stags, led by fourth year head coach Sydney Johnson, played their home games at Webster Bank Arena and were members of the Metro Atlantic Athletic Conference. They finished the season 7–24, 5–15 in MAAC play to finish in a tie for tenth place. They lost in the first round of the MAAC tournament to Saint Peter's.

Roster

Schedule

|-
!colspan=9 style="background:#C41E3A; color:#FFFFFF;"| Exhibition

|-
!colspan=9 style="background:#C41E3A; color:#FFFFFF;"| Regular season

|-
!colspan=9 style="background:#C41E3A; color:#FFFFFF;"| MAAC tournament

References

Fairfield Stags men's basketball seasons
Fairfield
Fairfield Stags
Fairfield Stags